Brown–Graves House and Brown's Store is a historic plantation complex located near Locust Hill, Caswell County, North Carolina.  The plantation house was built about 1800, and is a two-story, five bay, Late Georgian style frame dwelling.  It is set on a stone basement and has a low hipped roof.  The front facade features a one-story pedimented porch with Corinthian order columns.  Brown's Store is located across from the house and is a one-story, gabled frame building with a single shouldered stone and brick chimney.  Also on the property are the contributing two slave quarters, a smoke house, and a Greek Revival period law office.

It was added to the National Register of Historic Places in 1974.

References

Plantation houses in North Carolina
Houses on the National Register of Historic Places in North Carolina
Commercial buildings on the National Register of Historic Places in North Carolina
Georgian architecture in North Carolina
Houses completed in 1800
Houses in Caswell County, North Carolina
National Register of Historic Places in Caswell County, North Carolina
Slave cabins and quarters in the United States